The 1970–71 Villanova Wildcats men's basketball team represented Villanova University during the 1970–71 NCAA University Division men's basketball season. The team was led by head coach Jack Kraft and played its home games on campus at Villanova Field House in Villanova, Pennsylvania.

The independent Wildcats made a run through the NCAA tournament before falling to No. 1 UCLA, 68–62, in the championship game. Villanova finished with a  record.

Roster

Schedule and results

|-
!colspan=9 style=| Regular season

|-
!colspan=9 style=| NCAA Tournament

Rankings

NBA Draft

References

Villanova Wildcats men's basketball seasons
Villanova
Villanova
NCAA Division I men's basketball tournament Final Four seasons
Villanova Wildcats
Villanova Wildcats